Reduzum is a village in Leeuwarden municipality in the province of Friesland, the Netherlands. It had a population of around 1,320 in January 2017. The community is notable for working towards a sustainable energy consumption within the village.

History
The village was first mentioned in the 1389 as Rorthahusum, and either means settlement of the people of Ruerd (person) or settlement belonging to Raerd. Reduzum is a terp (artificial living mound) settlement from the early Middle Ages. The Dutch Reformed church which probably dates from the 15th century was enlarged in 1726 and received its iconic entry gate. The church tower was built in 1878.

In 1840, Reduzum was home to 438 people. During the 19th century, linear development occurred along the main road. In 1890, a dairy factory opened in the village.

Before 2014, Roordahuizum was part of Boarnsterhim municipality and before 1984 it belonged to Idaarderadeel.

Notable residents
Boëtius Epo

Gallery

References

Leeuwarden
Populated places in Friesland